The vernal pool fairy shrimp, Branchinecta lynchi, is a species of freshwater crustacean in the family Branchinectidae. It is endemic to the U.S. states of Oregon and California, living in vernal pools as well as non-vernal pool habitat. Vernal pool fairy shrimp are listed as a vulnerable species on the IUCN Red List, and has been listed as Federally Threatened species since 1994.

Description
Vernal pool fairy shrimp are usually translucent, however some have been observed to be white or orange.

They feature stalked compound eyes, no carapace, and eleven pairs of legs. The fairy shrimp swim by moving their legs from front to back in a wave-like motion. They eat algae, bacteria, protozoa, rotifers, and detritus, and are eaten by birds and other animals, notably by the tadpoles of spadefoot toads.

Vernal pool fairy shrimp have a lifetime of about two months. They usually hatch in early January, and die in early March.

The female fairy shrimp lay drought-resistant eggs shortly before they die. The eggs sink to the bottom of the vernal pools, embedding into the soil when they dry. When the vernal pool refills the next winter, the eggs hatch, starting the process over.

Habitat
Vernal pool fairy shrimp have been found in vernal pools in southern Oregon, and parts of California. In Oregon, they have been discovered in the Agate Desert, around Agate Lake, and on the Upper and Lower Table Rocks.
In California, fairy shrimp have been found in 33 locations in the Central Valley from Shasta County to Tulare County, and in the Coast Range from Solano County to San Benito County. They have also been found near Soda Lake, Santa Barbara County, the Santa Rosa Plateau, San Diego County and Riverside County.

References

Branchiopoda
Crustaceans of the United States
Endangered fauna of California
Freshwater crustaceans of North America
Natural history of Oregon
Taxonomy articles created by Polbot
ESA threatened species
Crustaceans described in 1990